David Franck Charvet (born 15 May 1972) is a French singer, actor, model, and television personality.

Early life
Charvet was born and raised in Lyon, France, the son of Christiane Charvet Haddad and businessman Paul Guez, founder of the Sasson brand of jeans in the 1980s. He was raised in a Jewish household.

He won a green card through the Morrison visa lottery in the early 1990s. In 1999, he left acting to pursue a music career. Until recently, Charvet lived in his native France, where he toured (among other parts of Europe) as a singer.

Acting career
Charvet caught his big break in 1992 on the American television program Baywatch as Matt Brody. He remained on Baywatch for three full seasons until 1995. He appeared as Craig Field on Melrose Place from 1996–98. Between 1995–99, he appeared in Seduced and Betrayed, Derby, Angel Flight Down, and Meet Prince Charming. He left acting in 1999 to concentrate on his musical career.

In 2006, Charvet returned to acting in a movie directed by Roger Christian called Prisoners of the Sun, which was only completed and released in 2013. He also appeared in the film Green Flash, also known as Beach Kings. In 2009, he took part in ABC's summer reality show The Superstars and came in third with his partner Lisa Leslie. In  2010, he was a contestant in the French reality show La Ferme Célébrités (French version of The Farm). The show was broadcast on TF1.

Music career

After successful runs at Baywatch and Melrose Place in the 1990s, Charvet decided to return to France with a 5-album contract with Universal Music Group France. During a span of seven years, he released three pop rock studio albums with self-titled David Charvet in 1997, Leap of Faith in 2002, and Se laisser quelque chose in 2004. His materials catered to both English and French language listeners for a wider spectrum of audiences.

His debut single "Should I Leave", a bilingual hit in French and English, hit #3 in France and also charted in Belgium and Sweden. His bilingual hit "Jusqu'au bout"/"Leap of Faith" reached #6 in France, followed by the bilingual "Apprendre à aimer"/"Teach Me How to Love" that made it to the French Top 20 and was a hit in Belgium, Switzerland, and the Netherlands. Charvet has sold over 2.5 million albums.

Interests
In June 2010, Charvet joined The Blue Seals, a non-profit organization aimed at providing a rapid response to environmental emergencies, focusing on ocean preservation, and is a member of its board of directors. It worked on raising awareness of the Deepwater Horizon oil spill, helping French company Ecoceane's ships designed to collect floating waste and hydrocarbons to take part in the cleanup.

Personal life

Charvet dated Pamela Anderson from 1992-1994. They met during their time on the show Baywatch. 
Charvet and Brooke Burke married on 12 August 2011; Brooke announced that she would take her husband's last name and be known as Brooke Burke-Charvet. They have two children together, daughter Heaven (born 2007) and son Shaya (born 2008), and are raising their children in the Jewish faith. Brooke already had two daughters from her first marriage to plastic surgeon Garth Fisher. In April 2018, the couple announced that they were divorcing after seven years of marriage. Their divorce was finalized in March 2020.

Charvet eventually left the entertainment career to spend more time with family. When building his house in Malibu in 2006, he was unhappy with the contractor's work, so he fired him and took over the work as the project manager, and would eventually continue in the construction business. As of 2022, Charvet runs Los Angeles-based residential contracting company The Jones Builders Group.

Filmography
TV series
1992-1995: Baywatch as Matt Brody
1994: Harts of the West as Tad
1996-1998: Melrose Place as Craig Field

Videos
1995: Baywatch: Forbidden Paradise as Matt Brody
2009: Green Flash aka Beach Kings as Cameron Day

TV films
1995: Seduced and Betrayed as Dan Hiller
1995: Derby as Cass Sundstrom
1996: Angel Flight Down as Brad Brown
2010: The Perfect Teacher (Spanish title: Falsa Inocencia; French title: Une élève trop parfaite) as Jim Wilkes

Feature films
1999: Meet Prince Charming as Jack Harris
2013: Prisoners of the Sun; French title: La malédiction de la pyramide as Doug Adler 

Reality shows
The Superstars (2009)
La Ferme Célébrités (2010)

Discography

Albums

Singles

*Did not appear in the official Belgian Ultratop 50 charts, but rather in the bubbling under Ultratip charts.

References

External links

1972 births
Living people
Mass media people from Lyon
Jewish French male actors
French male film actors
French male television actors
French environmentalists
French expatriate male actors in the United States
La Ferme Célébrités participants
20th-century French male actors
21st-century French male actors
21st-century French singers
21st-century French male singers